The Zinsser SmartCoat 200 is an ARCA Menards Series race held at Berlin Raceway. The race has been scheduled on either the ARCA Menards Series or ARCA Menards Series East schedules each year except for 2019 (and run each year except that year and 2020).

History
The ARCA Permatex SuperCar Series (now known as the ARCA Menards Series), ran its inaugural race at the track in 1986. It then was off the schedule for a dozen years. In 1999, it was added back to the series (now the ARCA Bondo/Mar-Hyde Series) schedule and remained on it each year until 2017, when it was taken off the ARCA schedule in exchange for a NASCAR K&N Pro Series East race.

Todd Gilliland won the only East Series race at the track in 2017. After one year on the East Series schedule, the race was moved back to the ARCA schedule in 2018 but taken off again in 2019.

A second East Series race (now the ARCA Menards Series East after ARCA's merger with NASCAR) was scheduled for July 25, 2020, but cancelled and replaced by a race at Toledo Speedway due to the COVID-19 pandemic. The race was moved back to the main ARCA Series schedule again in 2021.

Past winners

ARCA Menards Series

2000, 2005, 2009, & 2018: Race extended due to a green-white-checker finish.
2004: Race shortened due to rain.

East Series

Multiple winners (drivers)

Multiple winners (teams)

Manufacturer wins

References

External links
 

ARCA Menards Series East
Ottawa County, Michigan
ARCA Menards Series
ARCA Menards Series races
Motorsport in Michigan